Dusty Fingers is the name of a series of compilation records of songs that are widely admired as breakbeats collected by Bronx DJ Danny Dann the Beat Mann. Some of the songs featured contain "open breaks" which are solo drum passages which enable DJs to easily transition into them. These are also attractive to producers, who loop or rearrange them to create new compositions. Following in the tradition of the Ultimate Breaks and Beats series, the Dusty Fingers records contain an eclectic range of musical styles: mainly funk and jazz, but also including soul, rock, disco, and pop.

Many of the songs in the Dusty Fingers series have been sampled into new musical compositions, mainly by hip hop producers. Popular songs that sample songs from the Dusty Fingers series include "Guilty Conscience" by Eminem, "Find Your Wealth" by Nas, "Rowdy Rowdy" by 50 Cent, "Show Me What You Got" by Jay-Z, "Daydreamin'" by Lupe Fiasco, and "Dr. Carter" by Lil' Wayne.

Track listings
Volume 1
 Intro
 "Tense Preparation" - Nick Ingman
 "Lady Love" - Ferrante & Teicher
 "The Windmills of Your Mind" - Dorothy Ashby
 "Forty Days" - Billy Brooks
 "Get Thy Bearings" - Donovan
 "Hogin's Machine" - Les Baxter
 "Kismet" - Amon Düül II
 "The Warnings" - David Axelrod
 "On the Hill" - Oliver Sain
 "Bamboo Child" - Ryo Kawasaki
 "Holding You, Loving You" - Don Blackman
 "Hey Jude" - The Overton Berry Trio
 "Survival" - Annette Peacock
 "Dee Dee Drums" - Dee Dee Warwick
 Outro
Volume 2
 "Laying the Trap" - Gator Soundtrack
 "Go On and Cry" - Les McCann
 "Snow Creatures" - Quincy Jones
 "Children of the Night" - Hysear Don Walker
 "Bettina" - Bola Sete
 "Electric Surfboard" - Brother Jack McDuff
 "Smokey Joe the Dreamer" - Bullet
 "Soul Sides" - Art Farmer
 "Ripped Open by Metal Explosions" - Galt MacDermot
 "Holy Thursday" - David Axelrod
 "Shore Line Drive" - Sammy Nestico
 "You're No Good" - Harvey Averne
 "Puzzle" - Passport (Skit)
 "Faded Lady" - S.S.O (Skit)
Volume 3
 "Dermier Domicile Connu" - Generique
 "Shady Blues" - Pete Moore
 "Come Together" - The Phoenix Authority
 "Packed Up" - Bill Conti
 "Take Me with You" - Lyn Christopher
 "Pulp" - Steve Grey
 "Go Home, Pigs" - Ronald Stein
 "A Divine Image" - David Axelrod
 "While My Guitar Gently Weeps" - Jimmy Ponder
 "Return from Ashes" - John Dankworth
 "Darkest Light" - Lafayette Afro Rock Band
 "Safari" - Frank Walton
 "A Day in the Life" - Les DeMerle
 "The Spic" - Bullet
Volume 4
 "Le Bracelet" - Alain Goraguer
 "Psychedelic Portrait" - Jack Arel
 "Going Out of My Head" - George Saxon
 "I Wonder" - The Bubble Gum Machine
 "The Beggar Song" - Wet Willie (Skit)
 "Night Moves" - F. McDonald
 "Funky Chimes" - Francis Coppieters
 "Accadde a Bali" - Arawak
 "Scratch" - Souflay
 "The Moving Finger" - Dorthy Ashby
 "Misty Canyon" - Sven Libaek
 "Wenn der Urlaub Kommt" - Manfred Krug
 "Selected Sound" - Hardys Jet Band
 "Loving You, Girl" - John Schroeder
Volume 5
 "Solstice" - Brian Bennett
 "Algebrique" - Shoche
 "Signals" - Gerhard Trede And His Electronic Instruments
 "Mixed Drums" - Andy Loore
 "Love Sounds" - Intimate Strangers
 "Railroad" - Monk Higgins
 "Caccia al Cinese" - Franco Micalizzi
 "Soft Wind" - Gary Pacific Orchestra
 "Attention" - Head West (Drum Skit)
 "Jane B" - Jane Birkin
 "Bass in Action" - Toni Rubio
 "Dirty Drugs" - H. Thieme
Volume 6
 "Power of the Drums"
 "Under Pressure" - Nick Ingman
 "La Dimostrazione" - Danielle Patucchi
 "Silhouttes" - Dick Walter
 "Compression" - Ed Scogillera
 "Crossing the Border" - Jerry Goldsmith
 "Big Noise from Winnetka" - Eric Delaney
 "Future Past" - Absolute Elsewhere
 "Here We Are" - Churchill
 "Tibetian Serenity" - Travis Biggs
 "Dancer" - Spacey
 "Mao" - Joe Ki Peter Tomas Sound Group
 Drum skit
 Drum skit
Volume 7
 "Who is She and What is She to You?" - Madelaine
 "Rose Len" - Lennie Hibbert
 "Atlanta Inn" - Janne Schaffer
 "Space" - Tomorrow
 "L'Oiseau" - Alain Goraguer
 "Come Live with Me" - Dorothy Ashby
 "Walter L" - Jimmy Gordon
 "The Mudfoot" - Fat Albert
 "Hey, Jude" - Tuby Hayes
 "Monday, Monday" - Wally Richardson
 "Mickey Mouse Club" - Mike Curb Congregation
 "The Godfather" - The Professionals
 "Grigio Perla" - Gian Franco Pienzio
 "We're Only Just Begun" - Grant Green
Volume 8
 "Time is Passing" - Sun
 "Kriminal Theme" - Les Maledictus Sound
 "The Big Climb" - Paul Kass Parry Music
 "Les Caïds" - François de Roubaix
 "In Necessity" - Kerrie Biddell
 "Shakespeare's Sonnet" - Alla Pugacheva
 "Fat, Fat Fellow" - Daniel Janin
 "Roots" - Ian Carr
 "Drums" - Niagra
 "Gloaming (De Wolfe Library)" - L. Decosne
 "The Tense Scene" - Alan Hawkshaw
 "Atlantis" - R.M.O.
 "Trying Hard to Look Inside" - Waters
 "Stone Folk" - The Adacement
 "Fragment of Fear" - Sight & Sound
Volume 9
 "Hogan's Thing" - Simon Haseley
 "Who's Who" - Fred Merrett & Friends
 "Daydream" - Bernard Wystraete
 "Lightly Salted" - Barry Ungar
 "Bad Times" - Gerard McManon
 "Jamie's Theme" - Harnell
 "Super Snatch" - Flash Fearless
 "Pull Jabal Pull" - JJ Johnson
 "Interlude" - Brand New Funk
 "Being Tailed" - Roy Budd
 "Drumin" - Bill Near
 "War on the Streets" - Head Band
 "La Morte Accarezza a Mezzanotte" - Ed Ariete
 "Improv" - Ron Tutt & Jim Keltner
Volume 10
 "Space Guerilla"- Missus Beastly
 "Son of Popcorn" - Franz Auffray
 "The Unknown" - Brian Bennett
 "Light My Fire" - Johnny Harris
 "Impulsion Drums" - Barry Cooper
 "Kombination" - Gunther Fischer Quintet
 "Drum Skit 2" (Zouche Drums 3) - Dave Holland
 "Chapeau Melon et Bottes de Cuir" -  Laurie Johnson Orchestra
 "Requiem Pour un Con" - Serge Gainsbourg
 "Sand and Rain" - Nancy Holloway
 "Letrange Dr. Personne" - Carvelli
 "Relaxed Spacious" - A. Parker
 "Incidental Black Cloth" - K. Fleins Field
 "Lee Gagnon" - Scene des Guerriers
Volume 11
 "Confunktion" - D. Richmond
 "Music People" - Jack Mayborn
 "Are You Free" - Larry Robins Sport Studio Band
 "Devil's Masquerade" - Syrius
 "Les Dunes Dostende" - Francois de Roubaix
 "Southbound" - Sound Studio Orchestra
 "African Honeymoon" - Golden Music Orchestra
 "Type A to E" - Hiro Tsunoda
 "Take Me to the Mardi Gras" - The Spotnicks
 "Flower Dance" - Michel Gonet
 "Brute (Part 1 and 2)" - Louis Clark
 "Overtone" - Nick Ingman
 "Allora il Treno" - Bruno Nicolai
 "Yama Yama (Yamasuki)" - Daniel Vangarde
 "Voyages" - Michel Polnareff
Volume 12
 "The Fusion" - Jason Havelock
 "Caravan" - Puccio Roelens
 "Drama Blackcloth" - Alan Tew
 "Warlock" - R. Tilsley
 "Is That the Way" - The Message
 "The Prowler" - Brian Bennet
 "Gooseberry Fool" - P. Wilsher
 "Slow Soul" - The Travellers
 "Electric Blue" - Danny Edwardson
 "Light 6" - H. Flowers
 "Sally" - Frank Pleyer
 "Penguin" - Okay Temiz
 "New Religion" - Trifle
 "Oriental Vibrato [bonus]" - Raymond Guiyot
Volume 13
 "Solitude of the Mountains" - Gil Flat
 "Thief" - The Enticers
 "Like a Friend" - Roger Webb
 "Puella! Puella!" - Man
 "Flower Pot" - Load Stone
 "Flashpoint" - Roger Jackson
 "Number One Spy" - Syd Dale
 "Profil Grec 1" - Vladimir Cosma
 "Escalation" - Nowy
 "Lost Star" - Anthony King
 "Act of Threat" - Berry Lipman
 "Name of the Game" - Brian Bennett
 "Thunderbird" - Johnny Pearson
 "Careveli" - April Orchestra
 "A Time for Us" - Joe Pass
 "Tickatoo" - Dizzy Man's Band
Volume 14
 "Postaeolian Train Robbery" - Cos
 "Esconderijo" - Ze Rodrix
 "Kamen Rider" - Shunsuke Kikuchi
 "New Comer" - W. Rockman
 "The Theme From The Persuaders" - John Barry
 "Dream" - Shankar Family
 "Subtle Secret" - G. Studio Band
 "La Longue Marche" - Janko Nilovic
 "City Girl" - Main Attraction
 "Affanno" - Franco Micalizzi
 "Drums Away" - 2nd Generation
 "Maniac" - Steve Gray
 "Sentries Charge" - Al Hirt
 "Un Soir de Blanco" - Claude Thomain
Volume 15
 "Sound Stage 4" - Alan Parker
 "Tatou Strip Tease" - Michel Audiard
 "Friend and Enamys" - John Williams
 "Swamp Lizard" - The Olympic Runners
 "McQ" - Stanley Maxfield Orchestra
 "Dance Of The Vampires" - Vampires Of Dartmoor
 "Driving" - Driver OST
 "Tournament" - Dennis Farnon
 "Theme From Exorcist (Tubular Bells)" - Mike Oldfield
 "Orientale Contemplatino" - Rino De Filippi
 "Les Copans de la Basse" - Guy Pedersen
 "Don't Be Cool" - Jacky Giordano
 "I'm Gonna Love You Just a Little Bit More" - Uwe Buschkotter
 "Je Veux te Dire une Chanson" - Angelillo & Hamel
Volume 16
 "Day Light (Intro)" - John Cavars
 "City Police" - Dave Gold
 "Beams" - Dieter Reith
 "Superfine from Behind Lady" - Cleveland Wrecking Co.
 "Caprivi Strip" - Mike Hankinson Big Band
 "Hey, Jude" - Rock-Jazz Rhythm
 "Me Libertei" - Toni Tornado
 "Klaun a Tanečnice" - Václav Neckář & Bacily
 "Lupin III" - Yuji Ohno & You's Explosion Band
 "Night Walk" - Peter Kater
 "Ano Mama Dayo" - Kenji Sawada
 Unknown title - Sukemitsu Kawaya (?)
 "She's a Lady" - Great Pride
 "Gatto Nero" - Franco Campanino
 "Killer Whale" - G.Sklair/G.Galbraith
 "Planetárium - Vchod" - Václav Neckář & Bacily
 "Go For Broke" - Steve Gray
 "Leathel Injection" - Jo Ji Thi
 "Dahni Dinha Mantha" - Daniel Janin
 "Maskerade" - Drukwerk
 "Superstition" - Pedro & Capricious
 "Assistant's Rag (When You're Hot, You're Hot)" - Mother Freedom Band
Volume 17
 "Hit and Run at the Club" - Johnny Pate
 "A Pungi Nudi (Suite)" - Bixio Franco
 "Keep On Using Me" - Bill Moss and The Celestials
 "Stopover" - Laurie Johnson
 "Es Bleibt die Sonne" - Gerd Michaelis Chor
 "Na Opak" - Henryk Debich
 "Cat and Mouse in Berlin" - Roy Budd
 "Electrosorics N4 (Drums)" - Cecil Luter Georges Teperino
 "Hijack (Pt.1)" - Laurie Johnson
 "Blackout" - Mike Nock
 "Life" - Down Town Boogie Woogie Band
 "In Man Get" - Kollage Klatte
 "4 Tet" - Sadi
 "Last Tango in Paris" - Julio Gutiérrez 
 "Percussion Vol.1 (Drums)" - Bruton

References

Breakbeat
1990s compilation albums
Compilation album series
2000s compilation albums